Péter Komjáth (born 8 April 1953) is a Hungarian mathematician, working in set theory, especially combinatorial set theory. Komjáth is a professor at the Faculty of Sciences of the Eötvös Loránd University. He is currently a visiting faculty member at Emory University in the department of Mathematics and Computer Science.

Komjáth won a gold medal at the International Mathematical Olympiad in 1971. His Ph.D. advisor at Eötvös was András Hajnal, and he has two joint papers with Paul Erdős. He received the Paul Erdős Prize in 1990. He is a member of the Hungarian Academy of Sciences.

Selected publications
 Komjáth, Péter and Vilmos Totik: Problems and Theorems in Classical Set Theory, Springer-Verlag, Berlin, 2006. 
.
.
.

References

External links
 Hungarian Academy of Sciences Webpage
 Eötvös University Webpage
 Rutgers University Webpage

1953 births
Living people
20th-century Hungarian mathematicians
21st-century Hungarian mathematicians
Members of the Hungarian Academy of Sciences
Set theorists
Mathematicians from Budapest
Eötvös Loránd University alumni
Academic staff of Eötvös Loránd University
International Mathematical Olympiad participants